Highway 6 is a two-lane highway passing between the Kootenay and Okanagan regions in the province of British Columbia, Canada. It is divided into two parts—the Nelson-Nelway Highway between the Canada–US border and Nelson, and the Vernon-Slocan Highway between South Slocan and Vernon. It first opened in 1941, and its very winding path through the western Kootenays has not changed since.

Route description

Nelson-Nelway Highway

Highway 6 begins at the Canada–US border crossing at Nelway, where it connects with Washington State Route 31. The highway parallels the Salmo River for the rivers entire length from Nelson to the border and many views of the river can be seen from the highway.

Then it continues north for  passing through the communities of Porto Rico and Hall Siding, to the city of Nelson, just south of which (10 km) access to the Whitewater Ski Resort is located. Highway 3A merges onto Highway 6 in Nelson, and the two highways travel west for  along the Kootenay River, passing through the communities of Taghum, Bonnington Falls, Beasley and Corra Linn to where Highway 3A diverges southwest just west of South Slocan at Playmour Junction. The highway then proceeds north west up the Slocan Valley.

Vernon-Slocan Highway

From South Slocan, Highway 6 follows the Slocan River north for  passing through Winlaw, Slocan City and Silverton to the community of New Denver, where Highway 31A meets Highway 6.  northwest of New Denver, Highway 6 reaches its junction with Highway 23 at the resort community of Nakusp.

Highway 6 then proceeds west on its final  through the district of Coldstream, and terminates at a junction with Highway 97 in Vernon.

History
This section became part of Highway 97 in 1953.

Major intersections 
From south to north:

References

External links

06
Arrow Lakes
Slocan Valley
West Kootenay
006
Highways in the Okanagan